Twopenny may refer to:
 the British coin: see History of the British penny (1901–1970)
 Richard Twopenny, Australian journalist and journalist
 Twopenny (cricketer) (c. 1845 – 1883), the first Aboriginal Australian to play first-class cricket
 Twopenny Tube, an underground "tube" railway in London
 Two Penny Act, enacted in 1758 by the Virginia General Assembly

See also
Fivepenny (disambiguation)
Tenpenny (disambiguation)